Mississippi State University for Agriculture and Applied Science, commonly known as Mississippi State University (MSU), is a public land-grant research university adjacent to Starkville, Mississippi.  It is classified among "R1: Doctoral Universities – Very High Research Activity" and has a total research and development budget of $239.4 million, the largest in Mississippi. 

The university was chartered as Mississippi Agricultural & Mechanical College on February 28, 1878, and admitted its first students in 1880.  Organized into 12 colleges and schools, the university offers over 180 baccalaureate, graduate, and professional degree programs, and is home to Mississippi's only accredited programs in architecture and veterinary medicine.  Mississippi State participates in the National Sea Grant College Program and National Space Grant College and Fellowship Program. The university's main campus in Starkville is supplemented by auxiliary campuses in Meridian and Biloxi.

Mississippi State's intercollegiate sports teams, the Mississippi State Bulldogs, compete in NCAA Division I athletics as members of the Southeastern Conference's western division.  Mississippi State was a founding member of the SEC in 1932.  In their more-than 120-year history, the Bulldogs have won 21 individual national championships, 30 regular season conference championships, and 1 national championship title. The school is noted for a pervasive baseball fan culture, with Dudy Noble Field holding 22 of the top 25 all-time NCAA attendance records and the school's Left Field Lounge being described as an epicenter of college baseball.

History
The university began as The Agricultural and Mechanical College of the State of Mississippi (or Mississippi A&M), one of the national land-grant colleges established after Congress passed the Morrill Act in 1862. It was created by the Mississippi Legislature on February 28, 1878, to fulfill the mission of offering training in "agriculture, horticulture and the mechanical arts ... without excluding other scientific and classical studies, including military tactics." The university received its first students in the fall of 1880 in the presidency of General Stephen D. Lee.

In 1887 Congress passed the Hatch Act, which provided for the establishment of the Agricultural Experiment Station in 1888. The Cooperative Extension Service was established in 1914 by the Smith-Lever Act. The university has since had its mission expanded and redefined by the Legislature. In 1932, the Legislature renamed the university as Mississippi State College.

In 1958 the Legislature renamed the university Mississippi State University in recognition of its academic development and addition of graduate programs. The Graduate School had been organized (1936), doctoral degree programs had begun (1951), the School of Forest Resources had been established (1954), and the College of Arts and Sciences had replaced the General Science School (1956).

The university was desegregated in July 1965, when Richard E. Holmes, a graduate of Henderson High School in Starkville, became the first African-American student to enroll. The Civil Rights Act of 1964 was passed by Congress the year before, the Voting Rights Act of 1965 was being debated, and the United States Supreme Court had ruled in Brown v. Board of Education (1954) that segregation of public schools was unconstitutional.

The School of Architecture admitted its first students in 1973, the College of Veterinary Medicine admitted its first class in 1977. The MSU Vet school (commonly referred to as the CVM) is the largest veterinary school under one roof in the nation. The School of Accountancy was established in 1979.

The University Honors Program was founded in 1968 to provide more rigorous course curricula for academically talented students and support guest lecture series, forums, and distinguished external scholarships. The program has been vastly expanded and has a separate college. This was made possible by funding by Bobby Shackouls, an MSU alumnus and retired CEO, who donated US$10 million to found the Judy and Bobby Shackouls Honors College in April 2006.

MSU also started a joint Ph.D. program in engineering with San Jose State University in California, allowing an increase in research for both universities, as well as enhancing the stature of both engineering colleges.

In March 2009, Mississippi State announced the conclusion of the university's seven-year capital campaign, with more than $462 million received in private gifts and pledges.

Campuses
Mississippi State University is accredited by the Commission on Colleges of the Southern Association of Colleges and Schools to award baccalaureate, master's, specialist, and doctoral degrees.

The main campus is partially in Starkville and partially in the Mississippi State census-designated place.

Today, the university has the following colleges and schools:

As of Fall 2021, Mississippi State's enrollment was 23,086. The university has 160 buildings, and the grounds comprise about 4,200 acres (17 km²), including farms, pastures, and woodlands of the Experiment Station. The university also owns an additional 80,000 acres (320 km²) across the state.

Mississippi State University operates an off-campus, degree-granting center in Meridian that offers undergraduate and graduate programs. In cooperation with the U.S. Army Engineer Waterways Experiment Station, the College of Engineering offers the Master of Science degree to students in Vicksburg.

Mississippi State's campus is centered on the main quadrangle, called the Drill Field (pictured) due to its heavy use by the Corps of Cadets prior to the end of World War II. The Drill Field is defined at its north and south ends by the mirror-image buildings, Lee Hall (the original University building, now the division of languages building, far left in picture below) and Swalm Hall (home to the Dave C. Swalm School of Chemical Engineering, far right in picture below). Old Main was the original dormitory, west of Lee Hall; it burned in a tragic fire, and was replaced by the Colvard Student Union. The largest building fronting the Drill Field is Mitchell Memorial Library.

From the Drill Field, the campus radiates in all directions. The College of Engineering can be found mostly to the east side of the Drill Field; to the north are the Arts and Sciences, including Computer Science, and the College of Architecture, Art, and Design (CAAD). Humanities are found to the south, while Agriculture dominates the west section. To the west and northwest are also found the athletic facilities, including Scott Field and the Humphrey Coliseum, or The Hump.

Beyond the main campus (and the series of commuter parking lots ringing the main campus) are the North and South Farms. While still used for their original purpose of agricultural research, the Farms are also host to newer facilities, such as the astronomical observatory and Veterinary College (South Farm) and the High Performance Computing Collaboratory (North Farm). At the far west of campus, one finds first the fraternity and sorority houses, and beyond them the Cotton District and downtown Starkville, Mississippi. The university is also home to the Thad Cochran Research, Technology and Economic Development Park, which host many of the university's research centers, such as the Center for Advanced Vehicular Systems (CAVS) and the nationally recognized Social Science Research Center.

The Williams Building, which houses the MSU Police Department and the Faculty Senate, was designed by architect Emmett J. Hull.

Mitchell Memorial Library

The Mitchell Memorial Library is in the heart of the campus, on the eastern side of the Drill Field. The library has a collection of 2,124,341 volumes and 70,331 journals.

Mississippi State is one of the few universities to house presidential papers. In May 2012, on the 50th anniversary of the founding of the Ulysses S. Grant Association, Mississippi State University was selected as the permanent location for Ulysses S. Grant's Presidential Library. President Grant's artifacts are to remain permanently at the Mitchell Memorial Library on the MSU campus. These include Grant's letters and photographs during his presidency, from 1869 to 1877. The MSU library catalogued and cross-referenced 15,000 linear feet of material. Grant's letters have been edited and published in 32 volumes by the Ulysses S. Grant Association and the Southern Illinois University Press.

The library is also home to the Congressional and Political Research Center, which is on the first floor. This center, established in November 1999, houses the collections of US Senator John C. Stennis and Congressman G. V. Montgomery, nicknamed "Sonny". Their careers spanned a total of 72 years of service as Congressional leaders. The Center also provides research materials and information on individual US Senators and Representatives, the US Congress, and politics at all levels of government. It has begun to take on a significant research and policy role on a state, regional and national level.

Among the library's premier collections is that of internationally known author John Grisham, an MSU alumnus who donated his papers to the university in 1989. Grisham's collection, now consisting of over 42 cubic feet, has also attracted national attention to the library. Materials from the Grisham papers are on display in Mitchell Memorial Library's John Grisham Room (3rd floor), which opened in May 1998. The libraries also receive his published works, including foreign-language translations.

In 2000, the Charles H. Templeton Collection, which includes over 200 nineteenth- and twentieth-century music instruments, 22,000 pieces of sheet music, and 13,000 records, was transferred to the Libraries. According to world-renowned author and musicologist David A. Jasen, the Templeton Collection contains the most complete collection of Victor Talking Machines from their debut in 1897 to 1930. This Collection, valued at over $495,000 in 1989, serves as one of the libraries' premier collections. Items from the collection are on display at the Templeton Music Museum on the 4th floor of Mitchell Memorial Library. In 2001, a digitization project was established to digitize and provide access to the entire sheet music collection. To date, the project has digitized, archived and cataloged over 6,000 pieces of music.

The library hosts the Charles Templeton Ragtime Jazz Festival, an annual event including lectures and live performance of historic and contemporary ragtime. The festival debuted in March 2007, the first of its kind in Mississippi. The multi-day event features seminars, tours of the Templeton Music Museum, and concerts by some of the world's most renowned ragtime and jazz musicians.

The Junction

Formerly the poorly-conceived convergence of five often-congested roadways and, earlier, a rail line, this student-inspired concept got its name from the term "Malfunction Junction," the informal name of the crossroads prior to the vacation and rerouting of some of the roadways.  This resulted in improved traffic flow and ample new green space for leisure activities and events, including football tailgating.
 
Anchored by Davis Wade Stadium, Barnes & Noble Bookstore and the University Welcome Center, the Junction is the focal point of a pedestrian-friendly central campus and a significant gathering place for students, alumni and visitors. It is linked by paved walkways and green space to the university's other manicured "lawn", the historic Drill Field.

Student life

Housing
Residence halls at Mississippi State University:

Traditional style halls:
 Cresswell Hall - co-residential
 Critz Hall - co-residential
 Hathorn Hall - female
 Herbert Hall - co-residential
 Hull Hall - co-residential
 McKee Hall - male
 Rice Hall - female - closed Fall 2019
 Sessums Hall - female

New construction halls:
 Deavenport Hall - co-residential
 Dogwood Hall - co-residential
 Griffis Hall - co-residential
 Hurst Hall - co-residential
 Magnolia Hall - co-residential
 Moseley Hall - co-residential
 Nunnelee Hall (formerly North Hall) – co-residential
 Oak Hall - co-residential
 Ruby Hall - co-residential

Old Main

Old Main, originally called the Main Dormitory, was the first building on the campus. The first section of Old Main was built in 1880. Additions were constructed in 1901, 1903, 1906, and 1922. It is considered to have been the largest college dormitory in the United States. The building was destroyed by fire on the night of January 22, 1959. Henry Williamson, one of the dorm's 1,100 residents, died in the fire. Bricks salvaged from the fire were used to build the Chapel of Memories. Bricks from Old Main were also dumped in the area that became the band practice field for many years behind the Industrial Educational Building.

In 2014 the university began construction of a new academic building located at the corner of George Perry Street and Barr Avenue, behind the YMCA building. This building includes architectural elements that are similar in style to the Old Main Dormitory previously located on the west side of the Drill Field. It is named the "Old Main" Academic Center.

Student organizations
MSU has over 300 student organizations. Prominent groups include the Student Association, Famous Maroon Band, MSU Road Runners, Alumni Delegates, Maroon VIP, Lambda Sigma, Orientation Leaders, 18 fraternities and 11 sororities, the Residence Hall Association, the Black Student Alliance, the Mississippi State University College Democrats and Republicans, Music Maker Productions, the Baptist Student Union, the Engineering Student Council, Arnold Air Society, the Stennis-Montgomery Association and ChallengeX. The University Recreation department oversees the intramural sports program. There are many international student organizations active on campus, including the Nepalese Student Association and ISA, which organize various programs to educate students about their culture and traditions. The national literary magazine Jabberwock Review is also based at MSU.

Student media
Mississippi State's local radio station is WMSV.

Prior to WMSV, Mississippi State had a student-run radio station, WMSB, which went off the air permanently at the end of the spring semester of 1986. WMSB was a low-power FM station with studios on the top floor of Lee Hall. WMSB was begun in the fall semester of 1971 in a freshman dorm room on the third floor of Critz Hall, utilizing an FM stereo transmitter that was designed and built as a high school science fair project by one of the station's founders. The station's original call letters were RHOM. Later, funding was solicited from the Student Association. Funding was approved, the low-power RCA FM transmitter was ordered and the call letters WMSB were issued by the FCC. The station was moved to studios on the top floor of Lee Hall that were formerly occupied by a student-run AM station.

The student newspaper is The Reflector, published twice per week on Tuesday and Friday. The publication was named the #1 college newspaper in the South in 2007 by the Southeast Journalism Conference. In recent years, The Reflector has remained in the top 10 college newspapers in the South.

Music scene
Mississippi State is home to WMSV, the campus radio station, which routinely plays older alternative mainstream rock and pop from the 1990s. Much of the music on the radio station comes from syndicated radio programs from Public Radio International, but the station's homegrown music programs on Sunday afternoons and evenings emphasize jazz and blues classics.

Mississippi State and the city of Starkville play host the annual "Bulldog Bash", considered the largest outdoor concert in the state. The event is free and held in the Starkville Cotton District.

During the spring semester the Old Main Music Festival takes place, it is also free to the public, and is held on the Mississippi State Campus.

The city of Starkville and the Mississippi State campus have been a tour stop for many artists, including a visit in 1965 by Johnny Cash. After Cash's performance he was arrested, which led him to write the song "Starkville City Jail".

Lecture series
Every semester Mississippi State has several distinguished speakers; these have included best selling authors Greg Mortenson and Mississippi State alumnus John Grisham, former United States Secretary of State Condoleezza Rice, Academy Award-nominated Spike Lee, television science show hosts Jeff Lieberman and Dr. Neil deGrasse Tyson. Nobel laureates including Sir Harry Kroto (1996 Nobel Prize in Chemistry), J. M. G. Le Clézio (2008 Nobel Prize in Literature) and Joseph Stiglitz (2001 Nobel Memorial Prize in Economic Sciences) have also appeared.

SECU: SEC Academic Initiative
Mississippi State University is a member of the SEC Academic Consortium. Now renamed the SECU, the initiative was a collaborative endeavor designed to promote research, scholarship and achievement among the member universities in the Southeastern Conference. The SECU formed its mission to serve as a means to bolster collaborative academic endeavors of Southeastern Conference universities. Its goals include highlighting the endeavors and achievements of SEC faculty, students and its universities and advancing the academic reputation of SEC universities.

In 2013, Mississippi State University participated in the SEC Symposium in Atlanta, Georgia, which was organized and led by the University of Georgia and the UGA Bioenergy Systems Research Institute. The topic of the symposium was "Impact of the Southeast in the World's Renewable Energy Future."

Greek life
Mississippi State's Greek system comprises 20 fraternities (IFC and NPHC) and 14 sororities (Panhellenic and NPHC). Fraternities and sororities take part in a number of philanthropic programs and provide social opportunities for students. Formal rush takes place at the start of every fall semester for Panhellenic and IFC organizations. Membership intake for NPHC organizations occurs at specified times.

In 2019, 24% of undergraduate men and 18% of undergraduate women were active in MSU's Greek system.

IFC fraternities
 Alpha Gamma Rho
 Alpha Tau Omega
 Beta Upsilon Chi
 Delta Chi
 FarmHouse
 Kappa Alpha Order
 Kappa Sigma
 Lambda Chi Alpha
 Phi Delta Theta
 Phi Gamma Delta
 Phi Kappa Tau 
 Pi Kappa Alpha
 Pi Kappa Phi
 Sigma Alpha Epsilon
 Sigma Phi Epsilon
 Sigma Chi
 Sigma Nu

Other fraternities
 Alpha Phi Omega
 Gamma Beta Phi
 Kappa Kappa Psi
 Phi Mu Alpha Sinfonia
 Phi Sigma Pi
 Sigma Lambda Beta
 Theta Tau

Panhellenic sororities
 Alpha Chi Omega, 2021
 Alpha Delta Pi, 1966–1988, 2013–present
 Chi Omega, 1936
 Delta Delta Delta, 1972
 Delta Gamma, 1969
 Kappa Delta, 1971
 Phi Mu, 1962
 Pi Beta Phi, 2009
 Zeta Tau Alpha, 1940

Other sororities
 Sigma Phi Lambda
 Sigma Alpha Iota
 Delta Xi Phi, 1998
 Sigma Alpha

National Pan–Hellenic organizations
 Alpha Phi Alpha
 Alpha Kappa Alpha
 Kappa Alpha Psi
 Delta Sigma Theta
 Omega Psi Phi
 Phi Beta Sigma
 Zeta Phi Beta
 Sigma Gamma Rho

Athletics

Mississippi State University's sixteen athletic teams are known as the Bulldogs, which was adopted in 1961. Previous nicknames included the Aggies and the Maroons. Since 1935, the official mascot for Mississippi State has been a live English Bulldog named Bully. They compete in Division I of the NCAA and the western division of the 14-member Southeastern Conference (SEC). The Bulldogs have garnered a total of 28 conference championships (14 SEC).

Mississippi State's most successful sport is baseball. The Diamond Dogs have won 17 conference championships (11 SEC) and 6 SEC tournament championships, while making 28 NCAA Tournament, and 12 College World Series appearances, including a 2nd-place finish in 2013, and a national championship in 2021. The Diamond Dogs play home games at Dudy Noble Field, Polk-DeMent Stadium, which holds the NCAA record for the largest single on-campus baseball attendance at 15,586 (April 12, 2014, vs. Mississippi).  In 2021, Mississippi State University won its first, team, national championship in baseball. Mississippi State University beat Vanderbilt 2 out of 3 games to take the championship.

Mississippi State men's basketball has won 10 conference regular season championships (6 SEC), 4 conference tournament championships, and 7 divisional championships. The Bulldogs have made 10 NCAA Tournament appearances, highlighted by 3 Sweet Sixteen appearances and a trip to the Final Four in 1996. Both MSU men's and women's basketball teams play home games at Humphrey Coliseum, nicknamed "The Hump", one of the most intimidating places to play in the SEC with a seating capacity of 10,500.

Bulldog football is also a favorite among the MSU faithful. The Bulldogs play their home games at Davis Wade Stadium, the second oldest Division I-FBS football stadium in the nation, with a seating capacity of 61,337. Bulldog fans are known throughout the nation for bringing cowbells to "ring" Mississippi State on to victory. Cowbells became part of Mississippi State tradition in the 1970s, and were banned by the SEC in 1977, defined as "artificial noisemakers". For over 30 years, fans would secretly sneak their cowbells into the stadium, while security guards carefully "inspected" fans' possessions, continuing the unique tradition. In 2010, the SEC officially lifted the ban on artificial noisemakers, allowing fans to "ring responsibly" during pregame, timeouts, halftime, and Bulldog touchdowns. Mississippi State's first SEC championship came in 1941, as the Bulldogs finished with an 8-1-1 record. The Bulldogs also appeared in the 1998 SEC Championship Game after winning the SEC Western Division championship, before falling to eventual national champion Tennessee 14-24. Overall, MSU has appeared in 17 postseason bowl games, highlighted by trips to the Orange Bowl in 1937, 1941, and 2015. The official fight song and battle cry of Mississippi State is "Hail State", which is played by the Famous Maroon Band, the university's marching band.

Rankings

 In 2014, Mississippi State was ranked the 36th top college in the United States by the Social Mobility Index college rankings.
 In 2013, Forbes magazine's "America's Best College Buys" ranked Mississippi State University #279.
 In 2009, MSU's School of Landscape Architecture was ranked the second best program in the nation by the journal DesignIntelligence in its annual "America's Best Architecture & Design Schools" rankings. The journal gave the program high marks in teaching students skills related to construction methods and materials.  The University's School of Landscape Architecture program is the only such program in Mississippi.

U.S. News & World Report National Rankings

Notable alumni and faculty

See also

 List of agricultural universities and colleges
 List of architecture schools
 List of business schools in the United States
 List of engineering schools
 List of forestry universities and colleges
 List of land-grant universities
 List of schools of landscape architecture
 List of research universities in the United States
 List of schools of veterinary medicine

Notes

References

External links

 
 Mississippi State Athletics website
 
 

 
Land-grant universities and colleges
Educational institutions established in 1878
1878 establishments in Mississippi
Public universities and colleges in Mississippi
Universities and colleges accredited by the Southern Association of Colleges and Schools
Education in Oktibbeha County, Mississippi
Buildings and structures in Oktibbeha County, Mississippi
Education in Lauderdale County, Mississippi
Tourist attractions in Oktibbeha County, Mississippi
Starkville, Mississippi
Articles containing video clips